Ford railway station is a railway station in Ford, West Sussex, England. It is located on the West Coastway Line which runs between Brighton and Southampton and it is  down the line from  via . The station and the trains serving it are operated by Southern.

Location
Ford serves a rural community with only a few houses and one pub nearby, HMP Ford is about one mile south of the station. Adjacent to the station is the large model railway shop Gaugemaster.

Ford station is close to the junction from the West Coastway line to the Arun Valley Line and the short branch to Littlehampton. It is sometimes used as an interchange for those lines, however, due to the station's lack of facilities, most passengers prefer to change at Barnham.

Facilities 
Ford station has a ticket office which is open for part of the day. There are PERTIS 'Permit to Travel' passenger-operated ticket-issuing machines available at the entrances from the road to both platforms at those times when the ticket office is closed.

Ford was a 3 platform station but one platform was closed and is now abandoned and overgrown.

Ticket office (1 Window)
Waiting Rooms x2
Vending Machine (Sells Tea & Coffee)
Toilets
Post Box
Sheltered seating around the station
Departure Boards (1 on both platforms)
Subway (linking platforms)
Car Park

Information

The station is staffed Monday-Saturday 06:30-13:20 and Sunday 08:10-15:40. It has CCTV installed.

Services 
All services at Ford are operated by Southern using  and  EMUs.

The typical off-peak service in trains per hour is:
 2 tph to  via 
 1 tph to  via 
 2 tph to 
 3 tph to 
 1 tph to  
 1 tph to

Accidents and incidents
On 5 August 1951, an electric multiple unit overran signals and was in a rear-end collision with another at the station. Ten people were killed and 46 were injured.

Gallery

References

External links

Arun District
Railway stations in West Sussex
DfT Category E stations
Former London, Brighton and South Coast Railway stations
Railway stations in Great Britain opened in 1846
Railway stations served by Govia Thameslink Railway
1846 establishments in England